Quartermaine's Terms is a play by Simon Gray which won The Cheltenham Prize in 1982.

Plot
The play takes place over a period of two years in the 1960s in the staffroom at a Cambridge school for teaching English to foreigners. It deals with the interrelationship between seven teachers at the school, in particular that between St John Quartermaine and the others.

The dominant theme is loneliness, and during the course of the play all of the characters experience the trauma of being or feeling alone. Mark’s wife leaves him; Derek, from Hull, finds Cambridge initially unwelcoming; Eddie is ultimately bereaved by the loss of a partner; Anita’s husband is a philanderer; Henry is trapped in a dysfunctional nuclear family and Melanie is similarly trapped caring for a mother whom she despises. Quartermaine is a painfully lonely bachelor, seemingly with no friends other than his colleagues at the school.

Although the play is at times highly comic, it has a very serious theme; and the struggles of each character with their own types of loneliness are moving and sad. Above all, Quartermaine himself is an increasingly pathetic figure lost in his own confused thoughts – and ultimately deserted. His future as the play closes is poignantly bleak.

Original production
It was first staged on 30 July 1981 at the Queen’s Theatre, London.

Director: Harold Pinter
Producer: Michael Codron
Designer: Eileen Diss
Lighting: Leonard Tucker

Critical reception
The Stage wrote, "Simon Gray has written the best play of his notable career, a delicate, moving and yet consistently funny piece, eloquently directed by Harold Pinter, which depicts the English penchant for quiet suffering with immense skill."

Off-Broadway
The play was staged on 24 February 1983 at Playhouse 91 Theater, New York in a production by Long Wharf Theatre.
 
Producers: John A. McQuiggan & Ethel Watt 
Director: Kenneth Frankel
Settings: David Jenkins
Costumes: Bill Walker
Lighting: Pat Collins

Critical reception
The New York Times called it "a play that is at once full of doom and gloom and bristling with wry, even uproarious comedy. The mixture is so artfully balanced that we really don't know where the laughter ends and the tears begin: the playwright is in full possession of that Chekhovian territory where the tragedies and absurdities of life become one and the same."

TV adaptation

A film was broadcast on BBC Two in 1987, as part of the Screen Two series.

Producer: Louis Marks
Director: Bill Hays

Radio adaptations
The play was presented on BBC Radio 3 on 26 May 1991.
 
Director: Gordon House
The play was presented on BBC Radio 4 on Saturday 17 June 2006.

Producer: Catherine Bailey
Director: Maria Aitken

West End revival
The play opened at Wyndham's Theatre on 23 January 2013, after brief runs at Theatre Royal, Brighton, and the Theatre Royal, Bath.

Director: Richard Eyre
Producer: Michael Codron

Critical reception
The Guardian noted "a rueful social comedy that stands up well to revival and gives star billing to Rowan Atkinson, who reminds us in his first straight play in 25 years that he is a highly capable actor"; while The Daily Telegraph wrote "there’s a delight in watching a playwright so in control of his craft that he holds you riveted in a world where only the silence seems to scream."

References

External links 
 
 

1971 plays
British plays
English plays
West End plays
Off-Broadway plays
Plays adapted into television shows